The McGehee National Guard Armory is a historic armory building at 1610 South First Street in McGehee, Arkansas.  The armory, built in 1954, is a single story cinder block building faced in brick veneer.  The metal gable roof is supported by a steel frame, with clerestory awning windows on either side.  The large central area is surrounded on three sides by single story flat-roofed sections housing offices, kitchen space, and other support areas.  The design of the building is typical of those produced by the Arkansas National Guard at that time.  The building was used by the National Guard until 2005, and was given to the city the following year.

The building was listed on the National Register of Historic Places in 2006.

See also
National Register of Historic Places listings in Desha County, Arkansas

References

Armories on the National Register of Historic Places
Government buildings on the National Register of Historic Places in Arkansas
Government buildings completed in 1954
Buildings and structures in Desha County, Arkansas
National Register of Historic Places in Desha County, Arkansas